The Sultan Shoal Lighthouse (Chinese: 苏丹浅滩灯塔) was built in 1895 during the time when the late Commander Charles Quentin Gregan Craufurd (from the Royal Navy) was the Master Attendant (equivalent to the present day Port Master) of Singapore. It was built to replace the beacon previously established there.

History 
The lighthouse tower was rebuilt in 1931 for installation of modern lighting equipment.

In 1984, the lighthouse was automated and currently unmanned.

In 1992, LED navigational lanterns replaced the system.

A radar beacon was added to the lighthouse.

In 2014, Sultan Shoal Lighthouse was part of a lighthouse trail walk, consisting of three lighthouses, organised by the National Heritage Board as part of Singapore's HeritageFest. It was the first time the lighthouse was opened for public access.

Operations 
Three single-wick lamps fitted with parabolic reflectors were used. Incandescent oil dioptric light with ‘Hood’ burner was used in 1931 with a 3rd Order 500 mm optic. (The Order is a system of classifying the type of lenses used based on the focal length of the lens). This optic revolved on mercury, producing an intensity of 670,000 candelas with a visibility range of 22 nautical miles (about 40 km).  This kerosene burning lighting equipment was replaced in 1967 by an electrically operated 100-volt/1,000-watt light source. A generator room was built on the east side of the lighthouse to house three generators. With the generators, the seven-men lighthouse crew was reduced to four.

The 3rd Order optic was replaced by a rotating beacon, which possessed a revolving array of 24 lamps-cum-reflectors.  An ‘S’ and ‘X’ band radar beacon was also installed in 1984 which provides additional navigational information to ships by emitting a morse code on the ship's radar screen.

Operated by the Maritime and Port Authority of Singapore, the present lighthouse equipment consists of a main and standby rotating beacon, each producing 110,000 candelas with a range of 20 nautical miles (about 37 km)

See also

 List of lighthouses in Singapore

Gallery

References

External links
 Lighthouse Depot: Sultan Shoal Lighthouse
 Amateur Radio Lighthouse Society World List of Lights (WLOL): Singapore

Lighthouses completed in 1896
Lighthouses in Singapore
Western Islands Planning Area
19th-century architecture in Singapore